Shargeh or Sharegeh may refer to:
 Shargeh, Baneh
 Sharegeh, Marivan